Ralph Freman (1666–1742), of Aspenden Hall and Hamels, Hertfordshire, was an English politician who sat in the English and British House of Commons for 30 years from 1697 to 1727.

Freman was the eldest son of Ralph Freman, MP of Aspenden and his wife  Elizabeth Aubrey (died 1720), daughter of Sir John Aubrey, 1st Baronet of Llantrithyd, Glamorgan.  He was educated privately  under the pious James Bonnell and Daniel Duckfield, and travelled abroad in Holland, France and Italy from about 1678 to 1684. He married Elizabeth Catesby, the daughter and coheiress of Thomas Catesby of Ecton, Northamptonshire  with £4,000, under a settlement dated 17 February 1700.

Freman was elected Member of Parliament (MP) for Hertfordshire at a contested by-election on 30 December 1697 and again at the general election of 1698. He was very active politically, tightening his grip on his own constituency, and speaking and participating in parliamentary business in the House. His particular speciality was in dealing with electoral disputes. He was returned unopposed at the two general elections of 1701 and in 1702 and won contests at the general elections of 1705 and 1708. He was returned unopposed at the 1710 general election and chaired the Committee of privileges and elections from 1710 to 1713. He was returned unopposed at the 1713 general election. In 1714 he succeeded his father.

Freman was re-elected MP in a contest at Hertfordshire at the 1715 general election. He was a Tory who supported the Hanoverian succession, and was said to have refused the offer of a seat on the Admiralty Board. He was re-elected at the 1722 general election, but defeated by his brother-in-law Charles Caesar at the 1727 general election. He subsequently colluded with the Whigs in promoting William Plumer to defeat Caesar at the following election.

Freman commissioned the building of Hamels mansion in Braughing, Hertfordshire in 1713. He died on 8 June 1742, aged 76 leaving three sons.

References

1666 births
1742 deaths
People from East Hertfordshire District
Members of the Parliament of England for Hertfordshire
English MPs 1698–1700
English MPs 1701–1702
English MPs 1702–1705
English MPs 1705–1707
British MPs 1707–1708
British MPs 1708–1710
British MPs 1710–1713
British MPs 1713–1715
British MPs 1715–1722
British MPs 1722–1727